Charles Powell Walters (November 17, 1911 – August 13, 1982) was an American Hollywood director and choreographer most noted for his work in MGM musicals and comedies from the 1940s to the 1960s.

Early years
Charles Walters was born in Pasadena, California, the son of Joe Walter and Winifred Taft Walter, who had moved from Tomah, Wisconsin. He changed his last name to Walters in the 1930s because he was "tired of misspellings". Walters was educated at Anaheim Union 
High School (Class of 1930) and briefly attended the University of Southern California, Los Angeles.

Career

Actor
Shortly after graduating high school in 1931 Walters joined a touring Fanchon & Marco revue as a chorus boy and specialty dancer. After keeping a correspondence with producer, dancer and choreographer Leonard Sillman, Sillman agreed to cast Walters in the revue Low and Behold (1933) which also featured Tyrone Power, Eve Arden and Kay Thompson. The show never reached Broadway, but producer Charles Dillingham hired Sillman as a producer and Walters as a performer for a new Broadway revue, New Faces of 1934 spotlighting up-and-coming talent. Walters had a few dance numbers with Imogene Coca which drew good notices for both. Sillman hired Walters and Coca for another show, ‘’Fools Rush In’’ which flopped. Walters and Sillman parted ways following the fiasco but both remained good friends until Walters’s death.

On Broadway, Walters danced in Parade (1935) with frequent partner Dorothy Fox, and the Cole Porter-Moss Hart Jubilee (1935) where he introduced "Begin the Beguine" and "Just One of Those Things". Walters also appeared in the revue The Show is On (1937), directed by Vincente Minnelli, then was in Between the Devil (1937–38) and I Married an Angel (1938).

Choreographer
Walters was credited as choreographer on the Broadway show Sing Out the News (1938–39). He appeared in Cole Porter's popular Du Barry Was a Lady (1939–40), then choreographed an even more popular Porter work, Let's Face It! (1941–43). He did the dances for Banjo Eyes (1941–42), and went to RKO to work on the "dance ensembles" for RKO's Seven Days' Leave (1942).

Dance director at MGM
Walters went to MGM under contract as a dance director. Among the movies he worked on were Presenting Lily Mars (1943) (where he danced with Judy Garland at the end), Du Barry Was a Lady (1943), Best Foot Forward (1943) and Girl Crazy (1943) (where he again danced with Garland, in "Embraceable You").

Walters also worked on Broadway Rhythm (1944) and did uncredited choreography on Gaslight (1944) and Since You Went Away (1944). He then did Meet the People (1944), Meet Me in St. Louis (1944), and Thrill of a Romance (1945). Walters was dance director on Ziegfeld Follies (1945) and did uncredited directing of the segment "A Great Lady Has an Interview". He directed the 10-minute short Spreadin' the Jam (1946). He did choreography for Her Highness and the Bellboy (1945), Week-End at the Waldorf (1945), Bud Abbott and Lou Costello in Hollywood (1945) (in which he appeared), Till the Clouds Roll By (1946), and Summer Holiday (shot 1946, released 1948).

He returned to Broadway to choreograph St. Louis Woman (1946).

Director
Walters' first credited directorial effort was the musical Good News (1947) with June Allyson and Peter Lawford. He then did, Easter Parade (1948) with Fred Astaire and Judy Garland, He also directed Astaire and Ginger Rogers in The Barkleys of Broadway (1949). which was a mammoth hit for the studio, earning a profit of over $5 million, establishing Walters as a director.

Walters also directed Garland and Gene Kelly in Summer Stock (1950).

He followed this with his first non-musical comedy Three Guys Named Mike (1951), then the Esther Williams vehicle Texas Carnival (1951).  Walters went to Broadway to direct Garland's appearance at the Palace (1951–52) which ran for 266 performances. He went back to Hollywood to do The Belle of New York (1952), which starred Astaire and Vera-Ellen, and was a notable flop.

He received a Best Director Oscar nomination for the 1953 film Lili, starring Leslie Caron, for which Caron was also Oscar nominated.  Walters did another two with Williams, Dangerous When Wet (1953) and Easy to Love (1953).  In between these he tried his first drama, Torch Song (1953) with Joan Crawford.

Walters and Caron tried to repeat the success of Lili with The Glass Slipper (1955), but it was not as popular. However a Frank Sinatra-Debbie Reynolds comedy, The Tender Trap, (1955) was well liked, as was the Bing Crosby-Sinatra-Grace Kelly musical High Society (1956).

Walters directed some popular comedies, Don't Go Near the Water (1957) with Glenn Ford, Ask Any Girl (1959) with Shirley MacLaine and David Niven, and Please Don't Eat the Daisies (1960) with Doris Day and Niven. He also helped choreograph the number "The Night They Invented Champagne" in Gigi (1958) and did some uncredited directing on Cimarron (1960) and Go Naked in the World  (1961).

Walters then had two flops, Two Loves (1962) with MacLaine and Billy Rose's Jumbo (1962). He recovered with The Unsinkable Molly Brown (1964), which earned Debbie Reynolds her only Oscar nomination.

Later career
Walters' last theatrical film was for Columbia, Walk, Don't Run (1966), which was the last film for Cary Grant.

He continued to work in television, doing episodes of The Governor & J.J. and Here's Lucy. He directed Lucille Ball in two TV movies, Three for Two (1975) with Jackie Gleason, and What Now, Catherine Curtis? (1976).

Brent Phillips' book, Charles Walters: The Director Who Made Hollywood Dance, illuminates Walters' private life as a gay man.

Death 
Walters died of lung cancer on August 13, 1982, in his home in Malibu, California. He has a star on the Hollywood Walk of Fame at 6402 Hollywood Blvd.

Filmography

Director

Ziegfeld Follies (1946)
Good News (1947)
Easter Parade (1948)
The Barkleys of Broadway (1949)
Annie Get Your Gun (1950) (uncredited)
Summer Stock (1950)
Three Guys Named Mike (1951)
Texas Carnival (1951)
The Belle of New York (1952)
Lili (1953)
Dangerous When Wet (1953)
Torch Song (1953)
Easy to Love (1953)
The Glass Slipper (1955)
The Tender Trap (1955)
High Society (1956)
Don't Go Near the Water (1957)
Gigi (1958) (uncredited)
Ask Any Girl (1959)
Please Don't Eat the Daisies (1960)
Cimarron (1960)  (uncredited)
Go Naked in the World (1961) (uncredited)
Two Loves (1961)
Billy Rose's Jumbo (1962)
The Unsinkable Molly Brown (1964)
Walk, Don't Run (1966)

Actor

Presenting Lily Mars (1943) - Lily's Dance Partner in Finale (uncredited)
Girl Crazy (1943) - Student (uncredited)
Abbott and Costello in Hollywood (1945) - Sailor (uncredited)
Lili (1953) - Dance double for Jean-Pierre Aumont (uncredited)
Torch Song (1953) - Ralph Ellis (uncredited)
Easy to Love (1953) - Nightclub Dancer with Cyd Charisse (uncredited, last appearance)

References

External links

1911 births
1982 deaths
American male dancers
American choreographers
American male film actors
American male child actors
LGBT film directors
LGBT choreographers
American gay actors
People from Brooklyn
Film directors from California
Deaths from lung cancer in California
University of Southern California alumni
LGBT people from California
Film directors from New York City
20th-century American dancers
20th-century American male actors
20th-century LGBT people